There were 7 table tennis events at the 2018 South American Games in Cochabamba, Bolivia. 3 for men and 3 for women and one mixed. The events were held between June 2 and 7 at the Coliseo Polifuncional Evo Morales.

Events

References

External links
 South American Games – Table tennis 

2018 South American Games events
2018
South American Games